Bolton Wanderers Football Club is an English professional football club based in Horwich, Greater Manchester. The club was formed in Bolton in 1874 as Christ Church F.C. and was renamed Bolton Wanderers F.C. in 1877. They played their first competitive match in October 1881, when they entered the First Round of the 1881–82 FA Cup. The club moved to Burnden Park in 1895 and the Reebok Stadium in 1997. Since playing their first competitive match, 164 players have made at least 100 appearances (including substitute appearances); those players are listed here.

Bolton Wanderers's record appearance-maker is Eddie Hopkinson, who made more than 570 appearances between 1952 and 1970. The club's leading scorer is Nat Lofthouse with 285 goals in his 14 years with the club. Along with Hopkinson and Lofthouse, seven other players have made more than 500 appearances. Other than Lofthouse, only Joe Smith has scored more than 200 goals for the club.

List of players

Table headers
 Apps — Number of games played as a starter
 Sub — Number of games played as a substitute
 Total — Total number of games played, both as a starter and as a substitute

Statistics correct as of match played 17 March 2023

References

 
Players
Bolton Wanderers
Association football player non-biographical articles